The 2017 Orlando City SC season was the club's seventh season of existence in Orlando, and third season in Major League Soccer, the top-flight league in the United States soccer league system. The team opened the season with a 1–0 win over New York City FC, at the newly completed Orlando City Stadium.

Background

On December 29, 2016, club President Phil Rawlins announced his reduced role in the organization, acting as a liaison for the clubs and their brand in league matters (such as the MLS Expansion Committee), and consulting on the board of directors. The day-to-day operational duties were handed over to CEO Alex Leitão. In recognition for his nine years of service, owner Flavio Augusto da Silva announced that Phil's position would become permanent, bestowing the title of life-president. One of his first actions, on January 4, 2017, was to dedicate the 49 rainbow-colored seats in Section 12 of the new stadium to permanently honor the victims and families of those affected by the Pulse tragedy on June 12, 2016.

Roster
 Last updated on August 10, 2017

Staff

Competitions

Friendlies 
The Lions finish the preseason 2–2–2. Their first official match at the new stadium is a 3–1 friendly win against USL side St. Louis FC.

Major League Soccer 

All times in regular season on Eastern Daylight Time (UTC−04:00) except where otherwise noted.

The MLS schedule was released on January 12. Orlando City played its first regular season match in their new stadium on March 5, against their expansion rivals NYCFC. New expansion teams for this year are Minnesota United, led by former coach Adrian Heath, and Atlanta United. The squad goes into the season riding a 2-game winning streak, besting the Union at Philadelphia, and D.C. United at Camping World Stadium last October.

The team announced two sellouts on February 21: the Home Opener vs. NYCFC on March 5, and the L.A. Galaxy on April 15.

Officials with the Atlanta Stadium group announced on April 18 that the retractable roof will not be completed in time for their planned opening match between Atlanta United and Orlando City SC on July 30, forcing moving the game to Bobby Dodd Stadium on July 29. The Lions visited Mercedes-Benz Stadium on September 16, playing to a 3–3 draw, in front 70,425 fans. The game set an MLS attendance record, and registered as 4th-largest crowd in the world this season.

Results summary

Results

Standings
Eastern Conference table

Overall table

U.S. Open Cup 

Orlando City entered the tournament in the fourth round against Miami FC, who had beaten the Tampa Bay Rowdies 2–0 on May 31, 2017.

Player statistics

Appearances

Starting appearances are listed first, followed by substitute appearances after the + symbol where applicable.

|-
! colspan=10 style=background:#dcdcdc; text-align:center|Goalkeepers

|-
! colspan=10 style=background:#dcdcdc; text-align:center|Defenders

|-
! colspan=10 style=background:#dcdcdc; text-align:center|Midfielders

|-
! colspan=10 style=background:#dcdcdc; text-align:center|Forwards

|-
|colspan="10"|Players who appeared for the club but left during the season:

|}

Goalscorers

Shutouts

Disciplinary record

Player movement
Per Major League Soccer and club policies, terms of the deals do not get disclosed.

MLS SuperDraft picks 
Draft picks are not automatically signed to the team roster. The 2017 draft was held on January 13, 2017. Orlando had one selection.

Transfers in

Loans In

Transfers Out

Loans Out 
Because of the inclusion of Orlando City B to the new stadium for home games, player movement between the two squads became possible for both teams. Some members who had MLS contracts had the "Right of Recall" option, applicable at any time to the first-team roster.

Notable Events

Orlando Health was the jersey sponsor for the seventh consecutive season. New primary home kits were unveiled at the Fan Forum on Friday, February 17.

On April 22, it was announced that Orlando City, alongside 3 other MLS clubs, would wear a special kit in commemoration of the Earth Day. The kit, made entirely with recycled plastic from the Maldives at the Indian Ocean, was made by Adidas in conjunction with the Parley for the Oceans foundation, in order to address marine plastic pollution in the world. Orlando used this kit in an away game against New York City FC on April 23.

On May 8, the USSF announced that Orlando City Stadium would join other MLS clubs in hosting FIFA World Cup Qualifiers for the 2018 tournament. The venue hosted the October 8 home match between the United States against Panama. It was the first national team fixture in Orlando since a friendly against Sweden in 1998.

The fourth round draw of the 2017 Lamar Hunt U.S. Open Cup, announced on May 18, had the Lions hosting the winner of Miami FC and the Tampa Bay Rowdies at Orlando City Stadium the second week of June (see above).

Starting Goalkeeper Joe Bendik posted back-to-back years of 100+ saves before the team's largest win of the season, a 6–1 victory over the New England Revolution on September 27 at Orlando City Stadium.

With the New York Red Bulls win on October 7, the Lions were mathematically eliminated from the playoffs for the 3rd straight year.

Captain and first Designated Player Kaká declined a one-year extension on his contract in October 2017. He played his final match, assisting on Dom Dwyer's goal, and was subbed off in the 65th minute of a friendly fundraiser against the Puerto Rico national team on November 4.

On November 7, Orlando City Stadium was among 5 venues announced to host matches for the 2018 Florida Cup. It hosted the tournament's opening games on January 10–11, 2018.

References

Orlando City SC seasons